Mel Kenyon (born April 15, 1933 in DeKalb, Illinois) is a former midget car driver. He is known as the "King of the Midgets", "Miraculous Mel" and "Champion of Midget Auto Racing." The Motorsports Hall of Fame of America says "Many consider him to be midget car racing's greatest driver ever."

Racing career

He attended his first auto race in 1946. Kenyon began his racing career in 1954 racing a 1937 Chevy Coupe. He totaled the car when a tire blew out. He raced modified stocks in 1955. In 1958, Mel began his career in the midgets.

Kenyon's first championship was in NASCAR's Florida midget series in 1962, but he changed to USAC in the middle of the season and finished fifth in the USAC National Midget championship points.

Kenyon won the 1963 Turkey Night Grand Prix. He finished second in the 1963 USAC championship points, and won his first USAC National Midget championship in 1964.

Kenyon failed to qualify for his first Indianapolis 500 in 1965. Kenyon's tenth career race in a USAC IndyCar was at Langhorne Speedway in Langhorne, Pennsylvania on June 20, 1965. Mel's engine blew up sending oil all over the car, his firesuit and the track. He lost control of the car, hit the wall and was knocked unconscious. Jim Hurtubise and Ralph Liguori slid in the oily track and ran straight into Mel's fuel tank. Joe Leonard, also involved in the crash, rescued Kenyon from the burning car. Because of severe burns, Kenyon went through multiple operations at the San Antonio Burn Center, and he lost nearly all of his fingers on his left hand. Mel, his brother Don and their father Everett designed a special glove with a rubber grommet sewn into the palm. The glove fit on Mel's hand and hooked into the steering wheel. The trio formed a racing team called 3-K Racing, with Don as the crew chief.

Kenyon returned to racing in 1966. He had twelve first or second-place finishes, and finished second in the National Midget points. He qualified for his first Indianapolis 500 just eleven months after his fiery crash, and finished fifth.

He won 17 of 49 features to claim the National midget title in 1967.

Kenyon finished third in the 1968 Indianapolis 500 in a car sponsored by his hometown of Lebanon, Indiana. He did most of the work on the engine despite his hand. He routinely tore down and reassembled the Offenhauser engine by himself. He won the 1968 National Midget crown.

Kenyon took fourth in the 1969 Indianapolis 500.

He nearly won his first Champ car event at Michigan International Speedway on July 16, 1972. Kenyon was leading as he approached the white flag, but his Foyt powered Eagle ran out of fuel. Mel coasted around the track and finished third.

He finished fourth in his last of eight Indianapolis 500s in 1973. He had four Top 5 finishes in the classic race.

He won his second Turkey Night Grand Prix in 1975. The event was held on the 605 Speedway, the first time the event was held on pavement.

He had over 100 victories in midget cars in 1984 when he was inducted in the National Midget Auto Racing Hall of Fame. He won the 1985 National Midget championship a year after his induction.

Kenyon won the Indianapolis Speedrome midget car track title in 1993.

Kenyon stopped racing on the national tour in 1995 after his wife Marieanne became virtually comatose after suffering a major head injury in a bicycle accident. Kenyon won the Midwest-based NAMARS championships in 1995, 1996, and 1997 while in his sixties.

Kenyon continued racing after his 70th birthday in 2003. His son, Brice Kenyon, won the 2004 Indianapolis Speedrome midget track championship at the 1/5 mile track. Kenyon competed in the full schedule at the Indianapolis Speedrome in 2005 against his son.

Career summary
Kenyon has seven USAC National Midget championships, eight runners-up in the season points standings, and Top 5 point finishes in 21 of 27 seasons between 1966 and 1988.

At his Motorsports Hall of Fame induction in 2003 he had 111 feature wins, 131 seconds, 107 thirds, 81 fourths, and 69 fifths, for a total of 419 Top 5 finishes. He also had 688 Top 10 finishes. The totals are for USAC National midget races only, and don't include races in the NAMARS national races, regional or local races. He had counted 380 midget total feature wins, including wins in Australia and New Zealand. three NAMARS midget championships, and over 380 midget feature wins in all.

Kenyon competed in 65 USAC Championship (IndyCar) and eight Indianapolis 500 races.

Career awards
He was inducted in the International Motorsports Hall of Fame in 2003.
He was inducted in the Motorsports Hall of Fame of America in 2003.
He was inducted in the National Midget Auto Racing Hall of Fame.
Indianapolis Raceway Park hosts the annual "Mel Kenyon Classic" midget car race in his honor, and he has raced in the televised feature event in the 2000s.

Indy 500 results

References

1933 births
Living people
Indianapolis 500 drivers
International Motorsports Hall of Fame inductees
People from Lebanon, Indiana
Racing drivers from Indiana
People from DeKalb, Illinois
Burn survivors
American amputees
USAC Silver Crown Series drivers